The Syekh Burhanuddin Grand Mosque is one of the oldest mosques as well as a cultural heritage in West Sumatra, Indonesia. The mosque is located in Nagari Ulakan, Ulakan Tapakis sub-district, Padang Pariaman district of West Sumatra.

History 
The mosque was built by Burhanuddin Ulakan in 1670, making it one of the oldest mosques in Indonesia. The mosque was renovated for the first time in 1760, due to improper building conditions. The mosque was destroyed by the 2009 Sumatra earthquake. It was then rebuilt, and completed in 2011.

Architecture 
The mosque stands on  plot of land. This mosque has two minarets on both sides. In addition to being designed as a place of worship, this mosque is also prepared as a place for evacuation in the event of tsunami.

References 

Padang Pariaman Regency
Buildings and structures in West Sumatra
Cultural Properties of Indonesia in West Sumatra
Mosques in Indonesia
Religious buildings and structures completed in 1670
Tourist attractions in Sumatra
Islam in West Sumatra